Natural American Spirit (often referred to as American Spirit) is an American brand of cigarettes and other tobacco products, currently owned by Reynolds American and manufactured by the Santa Fe Natural Tobacco Company.

History
The company was founded in 1982 by Bill Drake, author of The Cultivators Handbook of Natural Tobacco, Robert Marion, Chris Webster, and Eb Wicks, a plumbing contractor who took out a loan to finance the startup. In January 2002, the company was acquired by Reynolds American and is now a wholly owned independent subsidiary of Reynolds American, which is in turn owned by British American Tobacco. Japan Tobacco announced in September 2015 that it acquired the right to sell Natural American Spirit products in markets outside the United States.

Markets

Natural American Spirit cigarettes have been sold in the United States, Canada, Netherlands, Belgium, Brazil, Luxembourg, United Kingdom, Germany, Switzerland, Austria, Tunisia, Japan, Spain, Italy, France, Greece, Finland and Denmark.

Products
Natural American Spirit offers various types of select filter cigarettes which are color-coded to denote the nicotine and tar contents, which are altered by using different filters and cigarette paper. American Spirit also has a Perique Blend Filter cigarette, which contains 10% Perique tobacco, and an Organic Filter cigarette, which contains organic tobacco.

Natural American Spirit also offers several "Roll Your Own" tobaccos in tins and pouches.

In the UK, American Spirit rolling tobacco comes in Blue (regular) or Yellow (light).

American Spirit cigarettes are sold in packs of 20. They come as follows:

Orange – Smooth Mellow Original Taste
Yellow – Original Blend Mellow Original Taste
Blue – Original Blend Full-bodied Taste
Light Green – Organic Mellow Menthol
Dark Green - Organic Full-Bodied Menthol
Gold : Organic Mellow Taste
Turquoise - Organic Full-Bodied Taste
Black - Perique Rich Robust Taste 
Light Blue - Full-Bodied Taste
Dark Blue - U.S. Grown Premium Full-Bodied Taste
Tan - U.S. Grown Premium Mellow Taste
Sky - Smooth Taste
Celadon Green - Unique Balanced Taste
Hunter Green - Full-Bodied Balanced Taste
Gray - Perique Rich Taste
Agate (Japan Only) - Rich Sweet Taste
Brown - Unique Non-Filtered

Controversies

The claim of additive-free cigarettes
Natural American Spirit products in the year 2000 were advertised as "100% Additive-Free Tobacco".

California Attorney General Jerry Brown announced on March 1, 2010, that his office had secured an agreement with the Santa Fe Natural Tobacco Company to clearly disclose that its organic tobacco is "no safer or healthier" than other tobacco products. Attorneys general from 32 other states and the District of Columbia signed onto the agreement.

Use of Native American imagery
The use of Native American/American Indian imagery by the brand, such as the depiction of an Indigenous person on the package and the use of fake folktales, has been criticized as cultural appropriation and promoting stereotypes. Research found that the use of this imagery led to many smokers, including Indigenous peoples, having the misperception that the brand was owned or operated by a tribe/on tribal land and that it was more "natural" and thus healthier. In response, Robin Sommers, the CEO and majority owner of Santa Fe Natural Tobacco Company, stated that "Native Americans are not a target market for American Spirit", stating that the use of this imagery was due to the company's goal to bring tobacco usage more in line with a perceived "moderation" by Indigenous peoples in the 15th century and that proceeds from sales support Native communities.

See also
 Health effects of tobacco
 Tobacco politics
 Tobacco smoking

References

R. J. Reynolds Tobacco Company brands